Sir John Douglas Kelso Grant  (born 17 October 1954) is a retired British diplomat whose last diplomatic post was Permanent Representative of the United Kingdom to the European Union between 2003 and 2007.
He now has a small number of part-time advisory roles.

Education 
Grant was born in Singapore and educated at the Edinburgh Academy and St Catharine's College, Cambridge, where he read French and German.

Career 
Grant's first postings were in Stockholm (1977–1980) and Moscow (1982–1984). After 18 months with Morgan Grenfell, a London-based merchant bank, he returned to the Foreign Office as a press officer. He was posted to Brussels in 1989 and spent most of the next eight years working there in three different roles.

He was Principal Private Secretary to the Foreign Secretary from 1997 to 1999 and served as British Ambassador to Sweden from 1999 to 2003.

Grant was then appointed UK Permanent Representative to the European Union. He chaired the Committee of Permanent Representatives (COREPER) during Britain's Presidency of the EU in 2005.

After leaving the Foreign Office in 2007 Grant worked for BHP Billiton in London from 2007 to 2009, was Executive Vice-President, Policy and Corporate Affairs, at BG Group from 2009 to 2015, and Vice-President, International Government Relations, Anadarko Petroleum Corporation from 2015 to 2019.

Offices held

References 

1954 births
Living people
People educated at Edinburgh Academy
Alumni of St Catharine's College, Cambridge
Permanent Representatives of the United Kingdom to the European Union
Ambassadors of the United Kingdom to Sweden
Principal Private Secretaries to the Secretary of State for Foreign and Commonwealth Affairs
Members of HM Diplomatic Service
20th-century British diplomats